This article contains records for Women's Twenty20 Internationals

Listing notation
Team notation
 (100/3) indicates that a team scored 100 runs for three wickets and the innings was closed, either due to a successful run chase or if no overs remained (or are able) to be bowled.
 (100) indicates that a team scored 100 runs and was all out, either by losing all ten wickets or by having one or more batsmen unable to bat and losing the remaining wickets.

Batting notation
 (100*) indicates a batsman scored 100 runs and was not out.
 (75) indicates that a batsman scored 75 runs and was out after that.

Bowling notation
 (5/40) indicates that a bowler has captured 5 wickets while giving away 40 runs.
 (19.5 overs) indicates that a team bowled 19 complete overs (each of six legal deliveries), and one incomplete over of just five deliveries.

Currently playing

Record took place in a Women's T20 World Cup match

Team records

Overall results

The result percentage excludes no results and counts ties (irrespective of a tiebreaker) as half a win.Last updated: 18 March 2023

Highest innings totals

Highest successful chases

Lowest innings totals

Lowest total defended successfully

Highest margin of victory (by runs)

Highest margin of victory (by balls remaining)

Highest margin of victory (by wickets) 

As of 21 February 2023, a total of 60 matches have been won by a margin of 10 wickets.

Smallest margin of victory (by runs)

Smallest margin of victory (by wickets)

Tied matches

Most consecutive wins by a team

Most consecutive defeats

Highest aggregate runs in a single match

Individual records (batting)

Most career runs

Most runs in each batting position

Most runs in a calendar year

Most 50+ scores

Highest career average

Highest career strike rate

Highest average in each batting position

Fastest to multiples of 1,000 runs

Most career sixes

Most career fours

Most career ducks

Highest individual score

Highest individual score (by batting position)

Fastest 50

Fastest 100

Individual records (bowling)

Most wickets in a career

Most wickets in a calendar year

Most four-wickets-in-an-innings (and over) in a career

Best career averages

Best figures in a match

Most runs conceded in an innings

Hat-tricks

As of 13 September 2021, there have been 22 hat-tricks in Women's T20 Internationals.

Individual records (fielding)

Most catches in T20I career

Individual records (wicket-keeper)

Most dismissals in career

Most catches in career

Most stumpings in career

Individual records (others)

Most matches played in career

Most matches as captain

Most matches won as a captain

Most player-of-the-match awards

Most player-of-the-series awards

Oldest players

Youngest players

Partnership records

Highest overall partnership runs by a pair

Highest partnerships (any wicket)

Highest partnerships (by wicket)

See also
 ICC Women's T20 World Cup
 List of women's Test cricket records
 List of women's One Day International cricket records
 List of men's Twenty20 International records

References

Lists of women Twenty20 International cricketers
Women's cricket-related lists
Women's Twenty20 International cricket records and statistics